Negative FX is the only full-length album released by Boston hardcore punk band Negative FX. It was released in 1984 on Taang! Records.

In 2002, Belgian label Reflex/Wolfpack Records reissued the album under the name Discography & Live with the addition of a live version of "Might Makes Right".

Track list
 "Feel Like a Man" – 1:59
 "Together" – 0:33
 "Protester" – 0:23
 "Mind Control" – 1:28
 "I Know Better" – 0:32
 "Citizens Arrest" – 0:50
 "Negative FX" – 0:24
 "The Few, The Proud" – 0:36
 "Punch in the Face" – 0:08
 "Primary Attack" – 0:30
 "Hazardous Waste" – 1:05
 "Turn Your Back" – 1:36
 "Nightstick Justice" – 0:22
 "I.D.N.T.F.S." – 0:36 (aka "I Don't Need This Fucking Shit")
 "Modern Problems" – 0:59
 "Nuclear Fear" – 0:40
 "VFW" – 2:36
 "Repeat" – 0:49

References

1984 albums
Taang! Records albums
Negative FX albums